The ABC International School (ABCIS), Ho Chi Minh City is an international school in Ho Chi Minh City, Vietnam, offering both a British and International curriculum education. The school is co-educational and  non-denominational. It comprises three campuses located in Ho Chi Minh City (Saigon), both in the Binh Chanh residential area in the south of the city.  Students  at the ABC International School follow the National Curriculum of England (and Wales) from age 2 to 14 (Nursery to Year 9) and IGCSE (International General Certificate of Secondary Education) and A Level examinations from Years 10–13. All students graduate to university and most attend top universities in the US, United Kingdom, Australia and Canada, many receiving academic scholarships to do so. The school is a registered centre for UK and many different international examination boards. 37 nationalities are represented among the student body.

History
The ABC International School was founded in 1995 with an enrolment of 7 students of nursery age. Originally centered on a small site in District 3, the school rapidly expanded and by 2006 this expansion necessitated the movement to a new, larger campus in Binh Chanh District. The school grew over time from a Nursery to a Primary and then a Primary and Secondary school; the first IGCSE examination cohort sat exams in 2007. The school, already registered with the Department for Education in the UK and with the Cambridge International Examination Board, began to branch out and join other bodies such as FOBISIA (Federation of British International Schools in Asia) and COBIS (The Council of British International Schools). The scope of examinations and opportunities available to the students increased as the school grew.

References

International schools in Vietnam
Cambridge schools in Vietnam